Luigi de Magistris (born 20 June 1967) is an Italian politician and a former prosecutor. He served as mayor of Naples from 2011 to 2021, and a member of the European Parliament from 2009 to 2011.

Biography
He started his career as a public prosecutor in 1995 and worked in Naples from 1998 to 2002. He was deputy public prosecutor in Catanzaro from 2002 to 2009 and was a Member of the European Parliament (MEP). His investigations have frequently focused on links between politicians and the Italian Mafia.

In 2011, de Magistris ran for the Mayor of Naples as the candidate of Italy of Values. He won in the second round, defeating the right-wing candidate Gianni Lettieri with 65% of the vote.

As his investigations involved famous names such as Romano Prodi, former Italian prime Minister, and Clemente Mastella, former Italian Minister of Justice, de Magistris has been at the centre of media controversy. The Minister of Justice Clemente Mastella asked de Magistris to be transferred because he had allegedly revealed Mastella's name as well as those of other Italian politicians apparently involved in his investigations. De Magistris appeared before the CSM (the governing board of the magistracy) in January 2008 to defend himself against the serious allegations of the Minister and his inspectors.

Luigi de Magistris has been the second most voted Italian politician in 2009 European elections.

In 2015, he founded the left-wing party Democracy and Autonomy. In 2016, he won a second mandate as Mayor of Naples, after obtaining 42% of the votes in the first round and 66% of the votes in a runoff against centre-right candidate Gianni Lettieri, the same candidate he had defeated five years earlier.

In 2017 he obtained the 'Valerioti-Impastato' award for his work against crime and corruption.

In 2021, he announced he would run as president of Calabria in the upcoming snap regional election to replace the late Jole Santelli.

In 2022 he launched People's Union. The coalition will participate in the 2022 general election.

Famous investigations
While in Catanzaro, he worked for several years on the "Poseidone" investigation into misuse by politicians of European Community subsidies for sewage filter systems and other business projects in Calabria. The "Poseidone" case was taken away from Luigi de Magistris, and as was the "Why Not" investigation in which the names of well-known politicians have come up. This investigation was due to be wound up after nearly two years and the persons involved formally indicted. Another case that de Magistris has been involved with is "Le Toghe Lucane", in Basilicata. One of the people to be questioned by de Magistris was Henry John Woodcock, a public prosecutor in Basilicata.

Poseidone
The European Anti-Fraud Office (OLAF) started the enquiry and handed it over to Luigi de Magistris in May 2005. Investigations started in May 2005 into an allegedly illegal use of 200 million € of European Community funds. Luigi de Magistris has been removed from the investigation with the accusation that de Magistris did not keep the details of the case confidential and revealed the names of people under investigation, including Forza Italia senator Giancarlo Pittelli and general Walter Lombardo Cretella.

Naples – "City of Peace"
In April 2018, de Magistris wrote to the head of the Naples port authority, Rear Admiral Arturo Faraone, expressing his displeasure with the presence of USS John Warner (SSN-785) near his city. It had fired six Tomahawk missiles during the 2018 bombing of Damascus and Homs. He made reference to a resolution passed in 2015 which declared the Port of Naples a "nuclear-free area." He called Naples a "City of Peace" that respects "the fundamental rights of everyone, convinced of disarmament and international cooperation," according to the Italian newspaper La Repubblica.

References

External links
 "The lodge of deals" in Espresso, 5 April 2007, translated into English on the site of OLAF
 Article about Luigi de Magistris in The Economist
  Interview in Italian of Luigi de Magistris from the Casalinuovo hall in Catanzaro
  Intervista al magistrato Luigi De Magistris sulla criminalità organizzata, Radio Radicale, 17 July 2007
 UDC until proven guilty, Hammer & Tongues weblog
 Articles written on l'Unità 

Mayors of Naples
Italian prosecutors
1967 births
Living people
Metropolitan City of Naples
Italy of Values MEPs
MEPs for Italy 2009–2014
Jurists from Naples
21st-century Italian politicians